Waikare is a locality in Northland, New Zealand. The Waikare River flows from the Russell Forest past Waikare and into the Waikare Inlet, which leads into the Bay of Islands.

The population is largely of the Te Kapotai hapū and Ngāti Pare iwi.

Demographics
The SA1 area is part of the larger Russell Forest-Rawhiti statistical area.

The SA1 statistical area had a population of 171 at the 2018 New Zealand census, an increase of 18 people (11.8%) since the 2013 census, and an increase of 33 people (23.9%) since the 2006 census. There were 48 households, comprising 84 males and 87 females, giving a sex ratio of 0.97 males per female. The median age was 31.3 years (compared with 37.4 years nationally), with 39 people (22.8%) aged under 15 years, 45 (26.3%) aged 15 to 29, 66 (38.6%) aged 30 to 64, and 21 (12.3%) aged 65 or older.

Ethnicities were 17.5% European/Pākehā, 91.2% Māori and 1.8% Pacific peoples. People may identify with more than one ethnicity.

Although some people chose not to answer the census's question about religious affiliation, 42.1% had no religion, 43.9% were Christian and 5.3% had Māori religious beliefs.

Of those at least 15 years old, 9 (6.8%) people had a bachelor's or higher degree, and 33 (25.0%) people had no formal qualifications. The median income was $17,300, compared with $31,800 nationally. The employment status of those at least 15 was that 42 (31.8%) people were employed full-time, 27 (20.5%) were part-time, and 12 (9.1%) were unemployed.

Marae
Waikare or Te Tūruki Marae and Te Huihuinga|Te Huihuinga or Te Aranga o te Pā meeting house is a meeting place for the Ngāpuhi hapū of Ngāti Pare and Te Kapotai.

Education
Te Kura o Waikare, also called Waikare School, is a coeducational full primary (years 1-8) school with a roll of  students as of  It is a Designated Special Character school with the Māori language as the principal language of instruction. The school replaced the previous Waikare School in 2004.

Notes

External links
Waikare School website

Far North District
Populated places in the Northland Region
Bay of Islands